Schlegelia is a group of plants described as a genus in 1844. The genus is named after the German anatomist and physician Paul Marquard Schlegel.

Schlegelia is native to tropical parts of the Western Hemisphere from southern Mexico and the West Indies to southern Brazil.

Species

References

Schlegeliaceae
Lamiales genera